The 2018–19 season was Morecambe's 12th consecutive season in League Two, the fourth tier of English football. They finished 18th in League Two, and also competed in the FA Cup, EFL Cup and EFL Trophy. They were eliminated in the First round of the FA Cup and the EFL Cup, and in the Group stage of the EFL Trophy.

The season page covers the period between 1 July 2018 and 30 June 2019.

Competitions

Pre-season friendlies
Morecambe revealed pre-season friendlies against Bamber Bridge, Alfreton Town, Chorley, Chester and Fleetwood Town.

League Two

League table

Results summary

Results by matchday

Matches
On 21 June 2018, the League Two fixtures for the forthcoming season were announced.

FA Cup

The first round draw was made live on BBC by Dennis Wise and Dion Dublin on 22 October.

EFL Cup

On 15 June 2018, the draw for the first round was made in Vietnam.

EFL Trophy
On 13 July 2018, the initial group stage draw bar the U21 invited clubs was announced.

Transfers

Transfers in

Transfers out

Loans in

Loans out

References

2017-18
Morecambe